Amiga, Inc. is a company that used to hold some trademarks and other assets associated with the Amiga personal computer (originally developed by Amiga Corporation).

Early years

In the early 1980s Jay Miner, along with other Atari, Inc. staffers, set up another chip-set project under a new company in Santa Clara, called Hi-Toro (later renamed to Amiga Corporation), where they could have some creative freedom.  Atari, Inc. went into contract with Amiga for licensed use of the chipset in a new high end game console and then later for use in a computer system.   $500,000 was advanced to Amiga to continue development of the chipset. Amiga negotiated with Commodore International two weeks prior to the contract deadline of 30 June 1984. In August 1984, Atari Corporation, under Jack Tramiel, sued Amiga for breach of contract. The case was settled in 1987 in a closed settlement. (See "Amiga Corporation".)

In 1994, Commodore filed for bankruptcy and its assets were purchased by Escom, a German PC manufacturer, who in turn went bankrupt in 1996. The Commodore-Amiga assets were then sold to another PC manufacturer, Gateway 2000, which had announced grand plans for the Amiga. However, in 1999, Gateway sold the assets (except for the patents, which were only licensed) to Amino Development for almost 5 million dollars. Gateway still retained ownership to the Commodore-Amiga patents. The last of the Commodore-Amiga patents (EP0316325B1 for "Cursor controlled user interface system", based on US887053) expired on July 14, 2007.

Dispute and settlement with Hyperion

Amiga, Inc. licensed the rights to make hardware using the AmigaOne brand to a computer vendor based in the UK, Eyetech Group. However, due to poor sales Eyetech suffered substantial losses and ceased trading.

In 2007 Amiga, Inc. announced specs for a new line of Amiga computers: low end and high models. At the same time Amiga, Inc. sued Hyperion Entertainment, a company developing AmigaOS 4 for AmigaOne boards for trademark infringement in the Washington Western District Court in Seattle, USA. The company claimed Hyperion was in breach of contract, citing trademark violation and copyright infringement concerning the development and marketing of AmigaOS 4.0.

Also in 2007, Amiga, Inc. intended to become the naming-rights sponsor for a planned ice hockey arena in Kent, Washington, but failed to deliver a promised down payment.

Pentti Kouri, Chairman of the Board and a primary source of capital for Amiga, Inc., died in 2009.

On 20 September 2009 Amiga Inc and Hyperion Entertainment reached a settlement where Hyperion is granted an exclusive, perpetual, worldwide right to AmigaOS 3.1 in order to use, develop, modify, commercialize, distribute and market AmigaOS 4.x and subsequent versions of AmigaOS (including AmigaOS 5).

Licensing rights
In 2010 Commodore USA announced they acquired the rights to the Amiga name and relaunch Amiga branded desktops running AROS
and Linux, which however Hyperion Entertainment promptly disputed, on the basis of a 2009 settlement agreement between Hyperion and Amiga Inc. After legal threats from Hyperion due to conditions in the Amiga Inc. settlement that they are now subject to as an Amiga licensee, Commodore USA later dropped their AROS plans and announced on their relaunched website, that they will create a new OS called AMIGA Workbench 5.0 (name changed to Commodore OS since Workbench was owned by Cloanto), which was later revealed will be based on Linux.

In 2011, Amiga Inc. licensed the brand name to Hong Kong based manufacturer IContain Systems, Ltd.

In 2012, Amiga Inc. completed the transfer of copyrights up to 1993 to Cloanto.

Recent events
Amiga Inc. is in dispute with Hyperion due to the release of Workbench 3.1.4 by Hyperion.

On 1 February 2019, Amiga Inc. transferred all its IP (including Amiga trademarks and remaining copyrights) to C-A Acquisition Corp., owned by Mike Battilana (director of Cloanto, company behind the Amiga Forever emulation package), later renamed to Amiga Corporation.

See also

Amiga, Inc. (South Dakota)
Amiga Corporation
Amiga computer
AmigaOne
AmigaOS 4

References

External links
 Amiga, Inc. Website (Archive.org, October 2017)

Amiga companies